This is a list of the main career statistics of professional Tunisian tennis player Ons Jabeur. She is the most successful Arab and African player. Her success is reflected in that she became the first Arab player, male or female, to be ranked inside the world’s top 10. In late June 2022, she climbed to the place of No.2 at the WTA Rankings as her highest singles ranking up to date. In 2020, she became the first Arab woman to reach a Grand Slam quarter-final at the 2020 Australian Open. She went further in 2022, reaching two back-to-back Grand Slam finals at Wimbledon and the US Open, respectively. So far, she has reached and won at least one WTA tournament from all the tiers (250, 500 & 1000). Winning WTA 1000 Madrid Open in 2022,  she become the first Arab or African woman to win a WTA 1000 event. She has won 3 WTA titles in total.

Performance timelines

Only main-draw results in WTA Tour, Grand Slam tournaments, Fed Cup/Billie Jean King Cup and Olympic Games are included in win–loss records.

Singles
Current after the 2023 Dubai Tennis Championship.

Doubles
Current after the 2022 season.

Significant finals

Grand Slam tournament finals

Singles: 2 (2 runners-up)

WTA 1000 finals

Singles: 2 (1 title, 1 runner-up)

WTA career finals

Singles: 10 (3 titles, 7 runner-ups)

Doubles: 1 (1 runner-up)

ITF Circuit finals

Singles: 15 (11 titles, 4 runner–ups)

Doubles: 2 (1 title, 1 runner–up)

Junior Grand Slam finals

Girls' singles: 2 (1 title, 1 runner–up)

Fed Cup/Billie Jean King Cup participation
Jabeur made her debut at the Fed Cup in 2011 playing for Tunisia in the Zone Group III. Since then, she has gained a singles record of 28–5, and a doubles record of 9–8.

Singles: 33 (28–5)

WTA Tour career earnings
Current after the 2022 season.

Career Grand Slam statistics

Career Grand Slam seedings 
The tournaments won by Jabeur are in boldface, and advanced into finals by Jabeur are in italics.

Best Grand Slam results details 
Grand Slam winners are in boldface, and runner-ups are in italics.

Record against other players

No. 1 wins

Record against top 10 players 

 She has a  record against players who were, at the time the match was played, ranked in the top 10.

Notes

References

Jabeur, Ons